Anthelm (fl. 763–770) was the 4th Bishop of Passau from 763–764 to 764–770.
His existence is verifiable. The exact dates of his reign are unknown. It is probable that during his office (or his successor's), the bones of St. Valentin were bought from Trent to Passau.

References

Year of birth unknown
Date of death unknown
Roman Catholic bishops of Passau
8th-century bishops in Bavaria